Arjun Pandit is a 1976 Hindi drama film directed by Hrishikesh Mukherjee. This film was based on a Bengali novel of Balai Chand Mukhopadhyay. The film's music is by Sachin Dev Burman.

Cast
 Sanjeev Kumar
 Ashok Kumar
 Vinod Mehra
 Bindu
 Deven Verma
 Sachin
 Keshto Mukherjee
 Sushil Bhatnagar
 Rajan Haksar
 Shubha Khote

Soundtrack

Awards

 24th Filmfare Awards:

Won

 Best Actor – Sanjeev Kumar
 Best Story – Balaichand Mukherjee

Nominated

 Best Supporting Actress – Bindu
 Best Comedian – Deven Verma

References

External links 
 

Films scored by S. D. Burman
1976 films
1970s Hindi-language films
Films directed by Hrishikesh Mukherjee
Films based on Indian novels
Films based on works by Balai Chand Mukhopadhyay